Shams Azar Qazvin is an Iranian football club based in Qazvin, Iran. They currently compete in the Azadegan League.

History

In September 2012, they bought the licence of Kaveh football club in order to participate in 2013–14 Iran Football's 2nd Division.

See also
 2013–14 Iran Football's 2nd Division

References

Football clubs in Iran
Association football clubs established in 2012